Jujyfruits are a chewy, gumdrop-like starch-based candy, manufactured by Heide Candy Company, a subsidiary of Ferrara Candy Company. Jujyfruits began production in 1920. They were popular in movie houses along with Heide's other gummy candy, Jujubes.

Description
The Jujyfruits shapes are Asparagus Bundle, Banana, Grape Bundle, Pea Pod, Pineapple, Raspberry, and Tomato. The banana shape is stamped with "HEIDE." Fruity flavors correspond to the colors (not the shapes) and include raspberry (red), anise/licorice (black), lime (green), orange (orange), and lemon (yellow). The candies are firm and harden with age or when chilled. A sour variety is also available.

Until January 1999, the green sweets were mint flavored. Hershey (the parent company at the time) changed them to lime after a customer survey found that mint was not a popular flavor.

Ingredients
, the ingredients listed on Jujyfruits boxes are:
Corn syrup
Sugar
Modified and unmodified cornstarch
Natural and artificial flavors
White mineral oil
Carnauba wax
Caramel color
Artificial colors (Yellow 6, Blue 1, Yellow 5 and Red 40)

Brand extension

In the 1970s, Jujyfruits held a promotion where customers could send five dollars and a token from a Jujyfruits carton to the Heide Candy Company and receive a brass buckle and leather belt in return.

In popular culture
Jujyfruits was featured in the TV series Seinfeld'''s fifth-season finale, "The Opposite", and was also briefly mentioned in the sixth-season episode "The Scofflaw".

The main character of the romantic fantasy film Beastly'' features a main character (Lindy) with a penchant for Jujyfruits.

See also
 List of confectionery brands

References

External links
 Jujyfruit Candy Website
 Official Ferrara Candy Website

Brand name confectionery
Farley's & Sathers Candy Company brands
Ferrara Candy Company brands
Products introduced in 1920
Candy